Indigenous Disability Awareness Month (IDAM; formerly Aboriginal Disability Awareness Month) is an annual Canadian observance created in 2015 by the British Columbia Aboriginal Network on Disability Society (BCANDS) and is observed/recognized by various government, communities and organizations across Canada. Indigenous Disability Awareness Month is believed to be the only Indigenous disability specific, recognized observance in the world.

History 
Indigenous Disability Awareness Month was created by the British Columbia Aboriginal Network on Disability Society (BCANDS) in 2015, to raise awareness of the significant contributions that Indigenous peoples (First Nation, Inuit, Métis)  living with disabilities bring to communities across Canada. The awareness month also seeks to bring increased awareness regarding the unique barriers that Indigenous peoples living with disabilities experience, limiting their ability to be active and included members within both Indigenous and non-Indigenous communities.

In early 2015, BCANDS began work on the development of Indigenous disability Awareness Month, initially engaging the government of British Columbia, the First Nations Summit and the Métis Nation British Columbia for their endorsement and recognition of the Month. In the fall of 2015, the government of British Columbia officially proclaimed November as Indigenous Disability Awareness Month with the First Nation Summit and Métis Nation British Columbia both passing organizational resolutions officially recognizing and declaring the month annually.

In 2016, the Assembly of First Nations (AFN) officially recognized and proclaimed the month through a resolution passed at an AFN Chiefs Assembly, Additionally in 2016, the government of Saskatchewan officially recognized and declared the month as did the Yukon Council of First Nations.

In 2017, the United Nations Committee on the Rights of Persons with Disabilities in their Concluding Observations to Canada after Canada's initial review since its signing of the Convention on the Rights of Persons with Disabilities (CRPD), recommended to Canada to officially proclaim and recognize Indigenous Disability Awareness Month nationally on an annual basis.

In 2021, the government of Manitoba officially recognized and proclaimed the month, as did the Canadian Capital Cities of Victoria, Regina, St. John's, Halifax, Fredericton and the Nation's Capital, Ottawa.

Since its creation in 2015, hundreds of communities, organizations, and various notable persons have recognized the month. In both 2020 and 2021, Canadian Prime Minister Justin Trudeau released a video in recognition of the month. Others recognizing and raising awareness on the month have included Marc Miller, federal Minister of Indigenous Services Canada, Carla Qualtrough, federal Minister of Employment, Workforce Development and Disability Inclusion, British Columbia Premier John Horgan as well as members of Canadian Legislative Assemblies, the Canadian Senate and Members of Parliament.

References 

2015 establishments in British Columbia
Disability observances
November observances
Month-long observances in Canada
Indigenous peoples in British Columbia